A Tale of Adam Mickiewicz's 'Forefathers' Eve' is a 1989 Polish drama film directed by Tadeusz Konwicki. It was entered into the 16th Moscow International Film Festival.

Cast
 Gustaw Holoubek as Hermit / Ghost / Gustaw-Konrad / Poet
 Jolanta Piętek-Górecka as Maryla / Girl / Virgin / Angel / Woman
 Artur Zmijewski as Gustaw-Konrad
 Teresa Budzisz-Krzyżanowska as Mrs. Rollison
 Maja Komorowska as Sorcerer
 Grażyna Szapołowska as Guardian Angel
 Henryk Bista as Senator
 Piotr Fronczewski as Sobolewski
 Tadeusz Łomnicki as Priest / Writer
 Janusz Michałowski as Father Piotr
 Jan Nowicki as Ghost / Belzebub
 Arunas Smailys as Adolf (as Arunas Smajlis)
 Marzena Manteska as Maid / Angel
 Monika Jóźwik as Maid (as Monika Orłoś)

References

External links
 

1989 films
1989 drama films
1980s Polish-language films
Adam Mickiewicz
Polish drama films